The anime of Air Gear was produced by Toei Animation and directed by Hajime Kamegaki. It ran from April 4, 2006 until September 27, 2006 on TV Tokyo.

Episode list

DVD List

Air Gear